Edward Fuller Witsell (March 29, 1891–November 27, 1969) was an officer in the United States Army who served as Adjutant General from 1946 to 1951. General Witsell was a 1911 graduate of The Citadel, The Military College of South Carolina and a World War I veteran.

He was a recipient of the Army Distinguished Service Medal.

See also
List of Adjutant Generals of the U.S. Army

References

Sources

External links

Generals of World War II

1891 births
1969 deaths
Adjutants general of the United States Army
United States Army personnel of World War I
Burials at Arlington National Cemetery
The Citadel, The Military College of South Carolina alumni
United States Army generals
United States Army generals of World War II